The Missouri Western Griffons college football team competes as part of the National Collegiate Athletic Association (NCAA) Division II, and represents Missouri Western State University  in the Mid-America Intercollegiate Athletics Association (MIAA). The Griffons play their home games at Spratt Stadium in St. Joseph, Missouri for since 1979. Since their inaugural season, Missouri Western has played in 273 games, and as of the 2014, they have an all-time record of 273 wins, 211 losses, 9 ties, and appeared in eight bowl games, and four NCAA Division II playoffs.

For the 1970–75 seasons, Missouri Western competed as a NAIA independent, unaffiliated with a conference. They would later join the Central States intercollegiate conference. In 1989 the Griffons joined the Missouri Intercollegiate Athletic Association, later renamed the Mid-America Intercollegiate Athletics Association, and the NCAA Division II ranks.

Seasons

References

Missouri Western Griffons
Missouri Western Griffons football seasons